Q-School 2017 – Event 2 was the second of two qualifying tournaments for the 2017/18 snooker season. It took place from 15 to 20 May 2017 at Preston Guild Hall in Preston, England.

Main draw

Round 1

Best of 7 frames

Section 1

Section 2

Section 3

Section 4

Order of Merit

In addition to the four qualifying players, the following four players earned a spot on the main tour through the Q School Order of Merit:

  Martin O'Donnell
  Sean O'Sullivan
  Joe Swail
  Zhang Yong

Century breaks

 130, 110  Wayne Brown
 128  Simon Bedford
 119  Joe Swail
 111  Paul Davison
 108  Ashley Carty
 106  Joshua Cooper
 104  James Cahill
 103  Jake Nicholson
 102  Joe O'Connor
 101  Lee Page
 100  Duane Jones

References

Snooker competitions in England
Q School (snooker)
2017 in snooker
2017 in English sport
Sport in Preston
May 2017 sports events in the United Kingdom